Boon is a surname that can be of Dutch, Old French or Chinese origin. The rather common Dutch name Boon often represents a patronymic, where the given name Boon was a short form of Boudewijn, Bonifacius or Bonaventure. Alternatively, boon meaning "bean" in Dutch, it can have a metonymic or metaphorical origin, referring to someone growing or selling beans, or one of small stature, respectively. The English surname can be from an attested variant form of Bohon/Bohun, a family descending from a Norman knight.

Notable people with the surname include:


A

Adam Boon (born 1998), Singaporean entrepreneur 
Alethea Boon (born 1984), Fiji-born New Zealand gymnast and weightlifter
Amos Boon (born 1972), Singaporean football goalkeeper

C

Charles Boon (1877–1943), English publisher
Clint Boon (born 1959), English musician, DJ and radio presenter

D

D. Boon (1958–1985), American punk guitarist and singer of The Minutemen
Dante Boon (born 1973), Dutch composer and pianist
Dany Boon stage name of Daniel Hamidou (born 1966), French comedian
David Boon (born 1960), Australian cricketer
Dickie Boon (1878–1961), Canadian ice hockey forward and manager

E

Ed Boon (born 1964), American video game programmer; co-creator of Mortal Kombat
Emilie Boon (born 1959), Dutch-born American children's book author and illustrator
Eric Boon (1919–1981), English boxer

G

Gerrit Boon (1768–1821), Dutch agent of the Holland Land Company, settler of Boonville, New York

H

Hugh P. Boon (1831–1908), American Union soldier in the American Civil War

I

Ingrid Tieken-Boon van Ostade (born 1954), Dutch sociolinguist

J

Jaak Boon (born 1948), Belgian television writer
Jan Boon (1911–1974), Dutch writer, journalist, and activist
Jazz Boon, Hong Kong television producer, director, and writer
Jill Boon (born 1987), Belgian field hockey player 
John D. Boon (1817–1864), American merchant and Oregon politician

K

 (1909–1996), Dutch art historian and museum curator
Kevin Alexander Boon (born 1956), American writer and filmmaker

L

Louis Paul Boon (1912–1979), Flemish novelist

M

Martin J. Boon (1840–1888), British trade unionist
Mick Boon (1902–1988), New Zealand cricketer
Mike Boon (born 1970), New Zealand stand-up comedian

N

Nika Boon, British singer-songwriter

R

Ratliff Boon (1781–1844), American politician, Governor of Indiana in 1822
Robert Boon (1916–2015), Dutch-born American film, television, and theater actor
Ronnie Boon (1909–1998), Welsh rugby player

S

Stuart Boon (1934–1989), English cricketer

T

Thierry Boon (born 1944), Belgian immunologist
Tim Boon (born 1961), English cricketer
Tom Boon (born 1990), Belgian field hockey player

W

William Boon (1911–1994), British chemist

Van der Boon
 (1804–1874), Dutch chemist and University Dean
Karla van der Boon (born 1968), Dutch water polo goalkeeper

See also
Boom (surname)
Boone (surname)

References

Dutch-language surnames
Patronymic surnames